Škoflje is a small settlement to the southeast of Šentvid pri Stični in the Municipality of Ivančna Gorica in central Slovenia. The area is part of the historical region of Lower Carniola. The municipality is now included in the Central Slovenia Statistical Region.

References

External links
Škoflje on Geopedia

Populated places in the Municipality of Ivančna Gorica